Oraesia pierronii is a species of moth of the family Erebidae first described by Paul Mabille in 1880. It is found on Madagascar and Réunion.

The wingspan of the male is 44 mm.

References

Calpinae
Moths of Madagascar
Moths of Réunion
Moths described in 1880